Robert Michael Portman (born March 22, 1947) is an American former professional basketball player. At 6'6" and 200 lb. he was positioned as a forward.

Portman attended Creighton University in Omaha, Nebraska, and played for three seasons (1966–1969). He left Creighton as the school's all-time leading scorer, a mark that stood for 22 seasons. Portman still holds the Creighton men's basketball single-game record for points scored in a game, 51 points against the University of Wisconsin–Milwaukee on December 16, 1967. Portman also holds the record for most points in a single season, 738 points during the 1967–1968 season, for an average of 29.5 points per game, also still a Creighton Bluejays school record. His brother Tom played basketball at Loyola Marymount University and his brother Bill played basketball at Gonzaga University. 

Portman played college basketball in an era where the NCAA did not allow college freshman to play on the varsity team. Thus, Portman played only three full seasons for the Creighton Bluejays, finishing 1,876 total points. Had Portman been able to play on the varsity squad, he most certainly would still be the school's all-time leading scorer. This feat is remarkable in another sense because Portman also played in the era of basketball where the three-point line was non-existent.

Portman was selected by the Denver Rockets in the 1969 American Basketball Association Draft, and with the 7th overall pick in the 1969 NBA draft by the San Francisco Warriors. He never played in the ABA but played four seasons with the Warriors and retired from the league in 1973.

External links
NBA stats @ databasebasketball.com

1947 births
Living people
American men's basketball players
Basketball players from San Francisco
Creighton Bluejays men's basketball players
Golden State Warriors players
San Francisco Warriors draft picks
San Francisco Warriors players
Shooting guards
Small forwards